Rait-Riivo Laane (born 24 May 1993) is an Estonian professional basketball player for Rapla KK of the Latvian-Estonian Basketball League. He is a 1.79 m (5 ft 10 in) tall point guard. He also represents the Estonian national basketball team internationally.

Awards and accomplishments

Individual
 2× KML Best Young Player: 2012, 2013

References

External links
 Rait-Riivo Laane at basket.ee 
 Rait-Riivo Laane at fiba.com

1993 births
Living people
People from Kohila
Estonian men's basketball players
Point guards
Korvpalli Meistriliiga players
Rapla KK players
TTÜ KK players